Wilhelm Naegel (August 3, 1904 – May 24, 1956) was a German politician of the Christian Democratic Union (CDU) and former member of the German Bundestag.

Life 
On 23 August 1946 he became a member of the Appointed Parliament of Hanover and on 9 December he became a member of the Appointed Parliament of Lower Saxony. He was a member of the Appointed Parliament of that state during the first legislative period from 20 April 1947 to 18 June 1947. In the 1949 federal elections, Naegel was elected to the German Bundestag on the CDU's state list, of which he was a member until his death. From 8 October 1953, he was chairman of the Bundestag's Committee on Economic Policy.

Literature

References

1904 births
1956 deaths
Members of the Bundestag for Lower Saxony
Members of the Bundestag 1953–1957
Members of the Bundestag 1949–1953
Members of the Bundestag for the Christian Democratic Union of Germany
Members of the Landtag of Lower Saxony